This is a list of different types of radar.

Detection and search radars

Search radars scan great volumes of space with pulses of short radio waves. They typically scan the volume two to four times a minute. The waves are usually less than a meter long. Ships and planes are metal, and reflect radio waves. The radar measures the distance to the reflector by measuring the time of the roundtrip from emission of a pulse to reception, dividing this by two, and then multiplying by the speed of light. To be accepted, the received pulse has to lie within a period of time called the range gate. The radar determines the direction because the short radio waves behave like a search light when emitted from the reflector of the radar set's antenna.

Search 

Early Warning (EW) Radar Radar Systems
Ground Control Intercept (GCI) Radar
Airborne Early Warning (AEW)
 Airborne ground surveillance (AGS)
Over-the-Horizon (OTH) Radar
Target Acquisition (TA, TAR) Radar Systems
Surface-to-Air Missile (SAM) Systems
Anti-Aircraft Artillery (AAA) Systems 
Surface Search (SS) Radar Systems 
Surface Search Radar
Coastal Surveillance Radar
Harbour Surveillance Radar
Antisubmarine Warfare (ASW) Radar
Height Finder (HF) Radar Systems
Gap Filler Radar Systems

Targeting radars 

Targeting radars utilize the same principle but scan smaller volumes of space far more often, usually several times a second or more, while a search radar will scan a larger volume less frequently. Missile lock-on describes the scenario where a targeting radar has acquired a target, and the fire control can calculate a path for the missile to the target; in semi-active radar homing systems, this implies that the missile can "see" the target that the targeting radar is "illuminating". Some targeting radars have a range gate that can track a target, to eliminate clutter and electronic countermeasures.

Missile guidance systems

Air-to-Air Missile (AAM)
Air-to-Surface Missile (ASM)
Surface-to-air missile (SAM) Systems
Surface-to-Surface Missiles (SSM) Systems

Others 
Target Tracking (TT) Systems
AAA Systems
Multi-Function Systems
Fire Control (FC) Systems
Acquisition Mode
Semiautomatic Tracking Mode
Manual Tracking Mode
Airborne Intercept (AI) Radars
Search Mode
TA Mode
TT Mode
Target Illumination (TI) Mode
Missile Guidance (MG) Mode
 Active electronically scanned array (AESA)

Battlefield and reconnaissance radar 

Battlefield Surveillance Systems
Counter-battery radar
Battlefield Surveillance Radars
Tactical Radar Identification and Location System
Countermortar/Counterbattery Systems
Shell Tracking Radars
Air Mapping Systems
Side looking airborne radar (SLAR)
Synthetic Aperture Radar (SAR)
Perimeter Surveillance Radar (PSR)
Red Dawn Radar System
 Ground Surveillance Radar
 Man portable radar

Instrumentation radars

Instrumentation radars are used to test aircraft, missiles, rockets, and munitions on government and private test ranges. They provide Time, Space, Position, Information (TSPI) data both for real time and post processing analysis.

Repurposed NASA and military radars
AN/FPS-16
MPQ-33/39
MPA-25
FPS-134
FPS-14
TPQ-18
FPQ-17

Commercial off-the-shelf (COTS)
Weibel MFTR series
Weibel MSL series
Weibel SL series

Custom
AN/MPS-39 Multi-Object Tracking Radar (MOTR)
TAMTS
BAE Rule
ROTR
ROSA
ROSA II
COSIP
Dynetics MRS

Fuzes and triggers 

Radar proximity fuzes are attached to anti-aircraft artillery shells or other explosive devices, and detonate the device when it approaches a large object. They use a small rapidly pulsing omnidirectional radar, usually with a powerful battery that has a long storage life, and a very short operational life. The fuzes used in anti-aircraft artillery have to be mechanically designed to accept fifty thousand g, yet still be cheap enough to throw away.

Weather-sensing radar systems 

Weather radars can resemble search radars. This radar uses radio waves along with horizontal, dual (horizontal and vertical), or circular polarization.  The frequency selection of weather radar is a performance compromise between precipitation reflectivity and attenuation due to atmospheric water vapor.  Some weather radars uses doppler shift to measure wind speeds and dual-polarization for identification of types of precipitations.

Weather radar
Wind profilers
 Millimetre cloud radar
CODAR

Navigational radars 

Navigational radars resemble search radar, but use very short waves that reflect from earth and stone. They are common on commercial ships and long-distance commercial aircraft.

Marine radars are used by ships for collision avoidance and navigation purposes.  The frequency band of radar used on most ships is X band (9 GHz/3 cm), but S band (3 GHz/10 cm) radar is also installed on most oceangoing ships to provide better detection of ships in rough sea and heavy rain condition. Vessel traffic services also use marine radars (X or S band) for tracking ARPA and provides collision avoidance or traffic regulation of ships in the surveillance area.

General purpose radars are increasingly being substituted for pure navigational radars. These generally use navigational radar frequencies, but modulate the pulse so the receiver can determine the type of surface of the reflector. The best general-purpose radars distinguish the rain of heavy storms, as well as land and vehicles. Some can superimpose sonar and map data from GPS position.

Air Traffic Control and navigation

Air traffic control uses primary and secondary radars. Primary radars are a "classical" radar which reflects all kind of echoes, including aircraft and clouds. Secondary radar emits pulses and listens for special answer of digital data emitted by an Aircraft Transponder as an answer. Transponders emit different kind of data like a 4 octal ID (mode A), the onboard calculated altitude (mode C) or the Callsign (not the flight number) (mode S). Military use transponders to establish the nationality and intention of an aircraft, so that air defenses can identify possibly hostile radar returns. This military system is called IFF (Identification Friend or Foe).

Air Traffic Control (ATC) Radars
Secondary Surveillance Radar (SSR) (Airport Surveillance Radar)
Ground Control Approach (GCA) Radars
Precision Approach Radar (PAR) Systems
Distance Measuring Equipment (DME)
Radio Beacons
Radar Altimeter (RA) Systems
Terrain-Following Radar (TFR) Systems
Radar altimeters measure an aircraft's true height above ground.

Space and range instrumentation radar systems
Space (SP) Tracking Systems
Range Instrumentation (RI) Systems
Video Relay/Downlink Systems
Space-based radar
Incoherent scatter

Mapping radars 

Mapping radars are used to scan a large region for remote sensing and geography applications. They generally use synthetic aperture radar, which limits them to relatively static targets, normally terrain.

Specific radar systems can sense a human behind walls.  This is possible since the reflective characteristics of humans are generally more diverse than those of the materials typically used in construction.  However, since humans reflect far less radar energy than metal does, these systems require sophisticated technology to isolate human targets and moreover to process any sort of detailed image. Through-the-wall radars can be made with Ultra Wideband impulse radar, micro-Doppler radar, and synthetic aperture radar (SAR).

 Imaging radar
 3D radar

Speed radar 
 Radar gun, for traffic policing and as used in some sports

Radars for biological research 

Radar range and wavelength can be adapted for different surveys of bird and  migration and daily habits. They can have other uses too in the biological field.
 
  Insect radar
Surveillance radar (mostly X and S band, i.e. primary ATC Radars)
Tracking radar (mostly X band, i.e. Fire Control Systems)
 Wearable radar and miniature radar systems are used as electric seeing aids for the visually impaired, as well as early warning collision detection and situational awareness.

See also 
 Radar engineering details
 Automatic Radar Plotting Aid
 Low probability of intercept
 Radar tracker

Notes 

Radar